Donald Lambro (born July 14, 1940) is an Albanian American journalist. He is the chief political correspondent of The Washington Times and a columnist formerly nationally syndicated by United Feature Syndicate and now by the Newspaper Enterprise Association.

Biography
Donald Lambro was born in Wellesley, Massachusetts, and graduated from Boston University with a degree in journalism. He began his career working for the Boston Herald-Traveler and in 1968 joined United Press International in Hartford, Connecticut, covering state government.

In 1981, the Conservative Political Action Conference awarded Don Lambro the "Outstanding Journalist Award" for his book Fat City. In 1985, he won the Warren Brookes Award for Excellence in Journalism.

Bibliography
 The Federal Rathole, 1975 
 The Conscience of a Young Conservative, 1976 
 Fat City: How Washington Wastes Your Taxes, 1980 
 Land of Opportunity: The Entrepreneurial Spirit in America, 1986 
 Washington—City of Scandals: Investigating Congress and Other Big Spenders, 1987

References

External links
 Donald Lambro column - The Washington Times

1940 births
Living people
People from Wellesley, Massachusetts
The Washington Times people
Boston University College of Communication alumni
American people of Albanian descent
20th-century American journalists
American male journalists